Zoya Kravchenko (born 24 May 1999) is a Kazakhstani sports shooter. She competed in the women's skeet event at the 2020 Summer Olympics.

References

External links
 

1999 births
Living people
Kazakhstani female sport shooters
Olympic shooters of Kazakhstan
Shooters at the 2020 Summer Olympics
Place of birth missing (living people)
21st-century Kazakhstani women